Hakaluki Haor is a marsh wetland ecosystem of north-eastern Bangladesh. It is one of Bangladesh's largest and one of Asia's large marsh wetland resources. Hakaluki Haor is bounded by the Kushiara river as well as a part of the Sonai Bardal river to the north, by the Fenchuganj-Kulaura railway to the west and to the south, and by the Kulaura-Beanibazar road the east. It lies between 24°35’ N to 24°44’ N and 92°00’ E to 92°08’ E.

A total of 558 species of animals and birds have been identified here, including some very rare – already declared as threatened, vulnerable, endangered and critically endangered species.   Some 190,000 people live in the surrounding Hakaluki haor area.

Hakaluki Haor was designated an Ecologically Critical Area (ECA).

The surface area of Hakaluki Haor is 181.15 km2, of which 72.46 km2 (40.01%) is within the territory of Barlekha Upazila. It is also under Kulaura Juri upazila of Moulvibazar District and Golapganj, Fenchuganj upazila of Sylhet district.

See also
Haor
Fenchuganj Upazila

References

Marshes of Bangladesh
Beanibazar Upazila
Barlekha Upazila
Fenchuganj Upazila
Juri Upazila
Golapganj Upazila
Kulaura Upazila